Khaneqah Bar (also Romanized as Khāneqāh Bar; also known as Chamūsh Maḩalleh and Khāneqāh) is a village in Howmeh Rural District, in the Central District of Masal County, Gilan Province, Iran. At the 2006 census, its population was 690, in 183 families.

References 

Populated places in Masal County